24th Multi-member Constituency is one of the five Bulgarian constituencies whose borders are different from the administrative division. It comprises several regions in Eastern and Central Sofia.

Background
In the 2009 Bulgarian parliamentary election the 24th Multi-member Constituency – Sofia-24 elected 11 members to the Bulgarian National Assembly: 10 of which were by proportionality vote and 1 was by first-past-the-post voting.

Members in the Bulgarian National Assembly
 Through first-past-the-post voting

 Through proportionality vote

Elections
2009 election

 proportionality vote

 first-past-the-post voting

See also
2009 Bulgarian parliamentary election
Politics of Bulgaria
List of Bulgarian Constituencies

References

Electoral divisions in Bulgaria
Sofia City Province